Carlo l'Ami (born 20 July 1966 in Leiden) is a Dutch football coach and former player who is currently the goalkeeping coach for Jupiler Pro League side Club Brugge.

During his playing career, he played as a goalkeeper for various Dutch clubs, including Excelsior, PSV, Heracles Almelo, SC Heerenveen, SC Cambuur, Telstar and Feyenoord. Following his playing career he became the goalkeeping coach for Feyenoord, Excelsior and then Ajax.

Club career
Carlo l'Ami began his playing career with local amateur side Blauw-Zwart in Wassenaar before being recruited to join the youth ranks of SBV Excelsior in Rotterdam. He then made his debut for Excelsior on 26 April 1987. Leaving the club two years later to join PSV Eindhoven, his stay with PSV would only last one season, before transferring once more, this time to SVV. After just one season in Schiedam, he joined Dordrecht '90 for one season, followed by a season with Heracles Almelo and another with Sparta Rotterdam. In 1993, he joined SC Heerenveen where he became the first choice keeper, remaining with the club for three seasons, before joining SC Cambuur on a six-month deal during the winter transfer window of his final season with Heerenveen. After his short stint with Cambuur, l'Ami joined SC Telstar for two seasons, returning to Rotterdam, where he returned to Excelsior for four seasons, and then subsequently playing for Feyenoord for one year, after which he retired.

Coaching career
Following his retirement in 2003, l'Ami became the new goalkeeping coach for Feyenoord under then manager Erwin Koeman, who was later replaced by Ruud Gullit during the two-year period in which Carlo served his tenure. He then returned to SBV Excelsior once more as goalkeeping coach under manager Ton Lokhoff for one season, before joining AFC Ajax as goalkeeping coach in 2007, where he is presently active. He has since been greatly involved with the coaching and direction of Ajax keepers such as Maarten Stekelenburg, Kenneth Vermeer and Jasper Cillessen.

Honours

Player
PSV
 Eredivisie: 1988–89
KNVB Cup: 1988–89

Coach
Ajax
Eredivisie (4): 2010–11, 2011–12, 2012–13, 2013–14
KNVB Cup (1): 2009–10
Johan Cruijff Shield (2): 2007, 2013

References 

1966 births
Living people
Dutch footballers
Association football goalkeepers
Eredivisie players
Eerste Divisie players
Excelsior Rotterdam players
PSV Eindhoven players
FC Dordrecht players
Heracles Almelo players
SV SVV players
Sparta Rotterdam players
SC Heerenveen players
SC Cambuur players
SC Telstar players
Feyenoord players
AFC Ajax non-playing staff
Footballers from Leiden
Association football goalkeeping coaches